Women in Arms (also known as Donne armate) is 1991 Italian television action-drama film directed by Sergio Corbucci. It was Corbucci's final work.

Plot
Nadia Cossa is a political prisoner who manages to escape during a transfer to a new prison. The young policewoman who was escorting her is suspended but starts investigating on her behalf and follows her trail.

Cast
  
 Lina Sastri as Nadia Cossa
 Cristina Marsillach as Angela Venturi 
 Donald Pleasence as Dreyfuss
 Franco Interlenghi as the prosecutor
 Massimo Bonetti  as Marco La Valle
 Glauco Onorato as Locasciulli
 Mariangela Giordano as Miss Locasciulli
 Cochi Ponzoni as Luigi Russo
 Biagio Pelligra as Antonio Guidotti
 Imma Piro as Angela's sister
 Lucio Rosato as Luigi Cosantini
 Marzio Honorato  as Renzi
 Vassili Karis as the killer 
 Arnaldo Ninchi as the blind man
 Raffaella Baracchi as Cora Cardinali
 Adriana Russo as Clara

Production
The film was co-produced by Fulvio Lucisano, Rai 2 and Odeon TV, marking the first co-production between RAI and a private television channel. It had a budget of about 6 billion lire.

Release
The film was broadcast on Rai 2 in two parts on 9-10 January 1991, about a month after Corbucci's death.

References

External links

1991 films
Italian crime drama films
1990s Italian-language films
Italian action films
Films directed by Sergio Corbucci